The German Women's Ice Hockey League (DFEL), also known as the German Women's Ice Hockey Bundesliga, is the top-tier women's ice hockey league in Germany. It was founded in 1988 by the German Ice Hockey Federation (DEB).

History
The German Women's Ice Hockey Bundesliga was created in 1988–89. Previously, the national championship took the form of a tournament featuring the best teams from the various regional federations. The Bundesliga was initially split into two divisions, North and South, with a final championship tournament at the end of the season, but in April 2006, the participating teams voted to have only a single division, starting from the 2006–07 season.

Teams

2022–23 season
Six teams participated in the 2022–23 DFEL season, following the withdrawal of Düsseldorfer EG after the 2019–20 season and the withdrawal of EC Köln ("Die Haie") after the 2021–22 season. The regular season began on 1 October 2022 and concluded on 19 February 2023. ECDC Memmingen were the regular season champions; the team featured both the league’s top scorer, American forward Theresa Knutson, and best goaltender, Emma Schweiger.

The top four teams from the regular season qualified for the playoffs, which were played on a best-of-five tournament schedule. In the semifinals, ECDC Memmingen swept ESC Planegg-Würmtal to take the series in three games and the Mad Dogs Mannheim bested ERC Ingolstadt in four games.

ECDC Memmingen did not slow down in the German Championship finals, sweeping Mad Dogs Mannheim in three games to claim the team’s fourth championship title.

Championship record

Medal table

German Women's Cup 
Beginning in the 2001–02 season, the German Ice Hockey Federation (DEB) organized an annual tournament called the DEB Women's Cup, which would be played over several days at the end of the DFEL season. It featured the top four or six teams from the most recent DFEL season, divided into two groups of two or three teams each. The tournament has not been held since 2018.

See also
Germany women's national ice hockey team
European Women's Hockey League (EWHL)

References

External links
League statistics and data sourced from EliteProspects.com, or EuroHockey.com, or HockeyArchives.info (in French)
Frauen-Bundesliga 

Ice hockey leagues in Germany
Women's ice hockey leagues in Europe
Sports leagues established in 1988
1988 establishments in West Germany
Bundesliga
Women's sports leagues in Germany
German women's ice hockey Bundesliga